Bakarwadi in Marathi Maharashtrian traditional crispy, deep-fried, disc-shaped, sweet and spicy snack popular in western state Maharashtra in India. It was already popular before 1960 when these were not Gujarat nor Maharashtra state;  they were both Bombay State and both cultures added their own flavors in each other's recipes.

History
It is believed that Bhakar comes from Bhakri and once rolled with masala stuffing (Vadi) and cut and fried it becomes Bhakar-Vadi. Chitale Bandhu of Pune and Jagdish-Farsan of Vadodara popularized the snack by distributing it nationally and internationally. It was popularized by Raghunathrao Chitale, a Marathi businessman.

In the 1970s, Narsinha Chitale tasted Bakarwadi, a popular Gujrati snack made by his neighbor. The only difference was that the neighbor made a 'Nagpuri' variant of the snack. Popularly known as 'Pudachi Vadi,' this "Nagpuri" variant was an extremely spicy roll, whereas the Gujrati staple snack has many garlic and onions. The amalgamation of the spicy Pudachi Vadi and the shape of Gujarati Bakarwadi is the iconic Chitale Bakarwadi. The combining the spiciness of the Nagpuri Pudachi Vadi and the shape of the Gujarati Bakarwadi and deep fry it for more crispiness,” says Indraneel. The recipe, perfected by Narasinha’s elder sister-in-law, Vijaya, and wife, Mangala, went on sale in 1976. 

This iconic Chitale-Bakarwadi was launched in the market in 1976 (Chitale Dairy since 1939,Chitalebandhu Mithaiwale since 1950 and Chitale-Bakarwadi since 1976), and shortly the brand saw a massive surge in demand for this snack. Jagdish-Farsan(Since 1938) (Jagdish Bhakharwadi) is famous during 1938-1960 in Gujarat. Many other brands like Haldiram also started to manufacture this snack.

Recipe
Bakarwadi is made from gram flour dough made into spirals stuffed with a mixture of coconut, poppy seeds and sesame seeds. It is then fried until it gets crispy. It can be stored for weeks and enjoyed as an evening snack.

In popular culture
Bhakharwadi aired on Sony SAB from 2019 to 2020. The comedy revolves around two neighboring families in Pune - one Marathi and other Gujarati - that differ in their attitudes towards the snack.

See also
 List of snack foods from the Indian subcontinent
Bhakharwadi (TV series)

References

External links

Indian desserts
Indian snack foods
Indian fast food
Gujarati cuisine
Maharashtrian cuisine